Carla Bautista Piqueras (born 14 March 2000) is a Spanish professional footballer who plays as a forward for Liga F club Rayo Vallecano.

Club career
Bautista started her career at Fundación Albacete B.

References

External links
Profile at La Liga

2000 births
Living people
Women's association football forwards
Spanish women's footballers
Sportspeople from Albacete
Footballers from Castilla–La Mancha
Fundación Albacete players
Atlético Madrid Femenino players
Real Sociedad (women) players
Valencia CF Femenino players
Rayo Vallecano Femenino players
Primera División (women) players
Segunda Federación (women) players
Real Oviedo (women) players
Primera Federación (women) players
Spain women's youth international footballers
21st-century Spanish women